Naturally occurring ytterbium (70Yb) is composed of 7 stable isotopes, 168Yb–176Yb, with 174Yb being the most abundant (31.83% natural abundance). Twenty-seven radioisotopes have been characterized, with the most stable being 169Yb with a half-life of 32.026 days, 175Yb with a half-life of 4.185 days, and 166Yb with a half-life of 56.7 hours. All of the remaining radioactive isotopes have half-lives that are less than 2 hours, and the majority of these have half-lives that are less than 20 minutes. This element also has 12 meta states, with the most stable being 169mYb (t1/2 46 seconds).

The isotopes of ytterbium range in atomic weight from 147.967 u (148Yb) to 180.9562 u (181Yb). The primary decay mode before the most abundant stable isotope, 174Yb is electron capture, and the primary mode after is beta emission. The primary decay products before 174Yb are isotopes of thulium, and the primary products after are isotopes of lutetium. Of interest to modern quantum optics, the different ytterbium isotopes follow either Bose–Einstein statistics or Fermi–Dirac statistics, leading to interesting behavior in optical lattices.

List of isotopes 

|-
| 148Yb
| style="text-align:right" | 70
| style="text-align:right" | 78
| 147.96742(64)#
| 250# ms
| β+
| 148Tm
| 0+
|
|
|-
| 149Yb
| style="text-align:right" | 70
| style="text-align:right" | 79
| 148.96404(54)#
| 0.7(2) s
| β+
| 149Tm
| (1/2+, 3/2+)
|
|
|-
| 150Yb
| style="text-align:right" | 70
| style="text-align:right" | 80
| 149.95842(43)#
| 700# ms [>200 ns]
| β+
| 150Tm
| 0+
|
|
|-
| rowspan=2|151Yb
| rowspan=2 style="text-align:right" | 70
| rowspan=2 style="text-align:right" | 81
| rowspan=2|150.95540(32)
| rowspan=2|1.6(5) s
| β+
| 151Tm
| rowspan=2|(1/2+)
| rowspan=2|
| rowspan=2|
|-
| β+, p (rare)
| 150Er
|-
| rowspan=2 style="text-indent:1em" | 151m1Yb
| rowspan=2 colspan="3" style="text-indent:2em" | 750(100)# keV
| rowspan=2|1.6(5) s
| β+
| 151Tm
| rowspan=2|(11/2−)
| rowspan=2|
| rowspan=2|
|-
| β+, p (rare)
| 150Er
|-
| style="text-indent:1em" | 151m2Yb
| colspan="3" style="text-indent:2em" | 1790(500)# keV
| 2.6(7) μs
|
|
| 19/2−#
|
|
|-
| style="text-indent:1em" | 151m3Yb
| colspan="3" style="text-indent:2em" | 2450(500)# keV
| 20(1) μs
|
|
| 27/2−#
|
|
|-
| rowspan=2|152Yb
| rowspan=2 style="text-align:right" | 70
| rowspan=2 style="text-align:right" | 82
| rowspan=2|151.95029(22)
| rowspan=2|3.04(6) s
| β+
| 152Tm
| rowspan=2|0+
| rowspan=2|
| rowspan=2|
|-
| β+, p (rare)
| 151Er
|-
| rowspan=3|153Yb
| rowspan=3 style="text-align:right" | 70
| rowspan=3 style="text-align:right" | 83
| rowspan=3|152.94948(21)#
| rowspan=3|4.2(2) s
| α (50%)
| 149Er
| rowspan=3|7/2−#
| rowspan=3|
| rowspan=3|
|-
| β+ (50%)
| 153Tm
|-
| β+, p (.008%)
| 152Er
|-
| style="text-indent:1em" | 153mYb
| colspan="3" style="text-indent:2em" | 2700(100) keV
| 15(1) μs
|
|
| (27/2−)
|
|
|-
| rowspan=2|154Yb
| rowspan=2 style="text-align:right" | 70
| rowspan=2 style="text-align:right" | 84
| rowspan=2|153.946394(19)
| rowspan=2|0.409(2) s
| α (92.8%)
| 150Er
| rowspan=2|0+
| rowspan=2|
| rowspan=2|
|-
| β+ (7.119%)
| 154Tm
|-
| rowspan=2|155Yb
| rowspan=2 style="text-align:right" | 70
| rowspan=2 style="text-align:right" | 85
| rowspan=2|154.945782(18)
| rowspan=2|1.793(19) s
| α (89%)
| 151Er
| rowspan=2|(7/2−)
| rowspan=2|
| rowspan=2|
|-
| β+ (11%)
| 155Tm
|-
| rowspan=2|156Yb
| rowspan=2 style="text-align:right" | 70
| rowspan=2 style="text-align:right" | 86
| rowspan=2|155.942818(12)
| rowspan=2|26.1(7) s
| β+ (90%)
| 156Tm
| rowspan=2|0+
| rowspan=2|
| rowspan=2|
|-
| α (10%)
| 152Er
|-
| rowspan=2|157Yb
| rowspan=2 style="text-align:right" | 70
| rowspan=2 style="text-align:right" | 87
| rowspan=2|156.942628(11)
| rowspan=2|38.6(10) s
| β+ (99.5%)
| 157Tm
| rowspan=2|7/2−
| rowspan=2|
| rowspan=2|
|-
| α (.5%)
| 153Er
|-
| rowspan=2|158Yb
| rowspan=2 style="text-align:right" | 70
| rowspan=2 style="text-align:right" | 88
| rowspan=2|157.939866(9)
| rowspan=2|1.49(13) min
| β+ (99.99%)
| 158Tm
| rowspan=2|0+
| rowspan=2|
| rowspan=2|
|-
| α (.0021%)
| 154Er
|-
| 159Yb
| style="text-align:right" | 70
| style="text-align:right" | 89
| 158.94005(2)
| 1.67(9) min
| β+
| 159Tm
| 5/2(−)
|
|
|-
| 160Yb
| style="text-align:right" | 70
| style="text-align:right" | 90
| 159.937552(18)
| 4.8(2) min
| β+
| 160Tm
| 0+
|
|
|-
| 161Yb
| style="text-align:right" | 70
| style="text-align:right" | 91
| 160.937902(17)
| 4.2(2) min
| β+
| 161Tm
| 3/2−
|
|
|-
| 162Yb
| style="text-align:right" | 70
| style="text-align:right" | 92
| 161.935768(17)
| 18.87(19) min
| β+
| 162Tm
| 0+
|
|
|-
| 163Yb
| style="text-align:right" | 70
| style="text-align:right" | 93
| 162.936334(17)
| 11.05(25) min
| β+
| 163Tm
| 3/2−
|
|
|-
| 164Yb
| style="text-align:right" | 70
| style="text-align:right" | 94
| 163.934489(17)
| 75.8(17) min
| EC
| 164Tm
| 0+
|
|
|-
| 165Yb
| style="text-align:right" | 70
| style="text-align:right" | 95
| 164.93528(3)
| 9.9(3) min
| β+
| 165Tm
| 5/2−
|
|
|-
| 166Yb
| style="text-align:right" | 70
| style="text-align:right" | 96
| 165.933882(9)
| 56.7(1) h
| EC
| 166Tm
| 0+
|
|
|-
| 167Yb
| style="text-align:right" | 70
| style="text-align:right" | 97
| 166.934950(5)
| 17.5(2) min
| β+
| 167Tm
| 5/2−
|
|
|-
| 168Yb
| style="text-align:right" | 70
| style="text-align:right" | 98
| 167.933897(5)
| colspan=3 align=center|Observationally Stable
| 0+
| 0.0013(1)
|
|-
| 169Yb
| style="text-align:right" | 70
| style="text-align:right" | 99
| 168.935190(5)
| 32.026(5) d
| EC
| 169Tm
| 7/2+
|
|
|-
| style="text-indent:1em" | 169mYb
| colspan="3" style="text-indent:2em" | 24.199(3) keV
| 46(2) s
| IT
| 169Yb
| 1/2−
|
|
|-
| 170Yb
| style="text-align:right" | 70
| style="text-align:right" | 100
| 169.9347618(26)
| colspan=3 align=center|Observationally Stable
| 0+
| 0.0304(15)
|
|-
| style="text-indent:1em" | 170mYb
| colspan="3" style="text-indent:2em" | 1258.46(14) keV
| 370(15) ns
|
|
| 4−
|
|
|-
| 171Yb
| style="text-align:right" | 70
| style="text-align:right" | 101
| 170.9363258(26)
| colspan=3 align=center|Observationally Stable
| 1/2−
| 0.1428(57)
|
|-
| style="text-indent:1em" | 171m1Yb
| colspan="3" style="text-indent:2em" | 95.282(2) keV
| 5.25(24) ms
| IT
| 171Yb
| 7/2+
|
|
|-
| style="text-indent:1em" | 171m2Yb
| colspan="3" style="text-indent:2em" | 122.416(2) keV
| 265(20) ns
|
|
| 5/2−
|
|
|-
| 172Yb
| style="text-align:right" | 70
| style="text-align:right" | 102
| 171.9363815(26)
| colspan=3 align=center|Observationally Stable
| 0+
| 0.2183(67)
|
|-
| 173Yb
| style="text-align:right" | 70
| style="text-align:right" | 103
| 172.9382108(26)
| colspan=3 align=center|Observationally Stable
| 5/2−
| 0.1613(27)
|
|-
| style="text-indent:1em" | 173mYb
| colspan="3" style="text-indent:2em" | 398.9(5) keV
| 2.9(1) μs
|
|
| 1/2−
|
|
|-
| 174Yb
| style="text-align:right" | 70
| style="text-align:right" | 104
| 173.9388621(26)
| colspan=3 align=center|Observationally Stable
| 0+
| 0.3183(92)
|
|-
| 175Yb
| style="text-align:right" | 70
| style="text-align:right" | 105
| 174.9412765(26)
| 4.185(1) d
| β−
| 175Lu
| 7/2−
|
|
|-
| style="text-indent:1em" | 175mYb
| colspan="3" style="text-indent:2em" | 514.865(4) keV
| 68.2(3) ms
|
|
| 1/2−
|
|
|-
| 176Yb
| style="text-align:right" | 70
| style="text-align:right" | 106
| 175.9425717(28)
| colspan=3 align=center|Observationally Stable
| 0+
| 0.1276(41)
|
|-
| style="text-indent:1em" | 176mYb
| colspan="3" style="text-indent:2em" | 1050.0(3) keV
| 11.4(3) s
|
|
| (8)−
|
|
|-
| 177Yb
| style="text-align:right" | 70
| style="text-align:right" | 107
| 176.9452608(28)
| 1.911(3) h
| β−
| 177Lu
| (9/2+)
|
|
|-
| style="text-indent:1em" | 177mYb
| colspan="3" style="text-indent:2em" | 331.5(3) keV
| 6.41(2) s
| IT
| 177Yb
| (1/2−)
|
|
|-
| 178Yb
| style="text-align:right" | 70
| style="text-align:right" | 108
| 177.946647(11)
| 74(3) min
| β−
| 178Lu
| 0+
|
|
|-
| 179Yb
| style="text-align:right" | 70
| style="text-align:right" | 109
| 178.95017(32)#
| 8.0(4) min
| β−
| 179Lu
| (1/2−)
|
|
|-
| 180Yb
| style="text-align:right" | 70
| style="text-align:right" | 110
| 179.95233(43)#
| 2.4(5) min
| β−
| 180Lu
| 0+
|
|
|-
| 181Yb
| style="text-align:right" | 70
| style="text-align:right" | 111
| 180.95615(43)#
| 1# min
| β−
| 181Lu
| 3/2−#
|
|
|-
| 182Yb
| style="text-align:right" | 70
| style="text-align:right" | 112
|
| > 160 ns
| β−
| 182Lu
| 0+
|
|

References 

 Isotope masses from:

 Isotopic compositions and standard atomic masses from:

 Half-life, spin, and isomer data selected from the following sources.

 
Ytterbium
Ytterbium